Platygillellus brasiliensis, the Brazilian sand stargazer, is a species of sand stargazer native to the Atlantic coast of Brazil where it can be found at depths of from  in areas with gravel substrates in which it buries itself almost completely except the eyes and the dorsal finlet.  Males of this species can reach a maximum length of  SL, while females can reach a maximum length of  SL.

References

External links
 Photograph

brasiliensis
Fish described in 2002